Statistics of Swedish football Division 3 for the 1931–32 season.

League standings

Uppsvenska 1931–32

Östsvenska 1931–32

Mellansvenska 1931–32

Nordvästra 1931–32

Södra Mellansvenska 1931–32

Sydöstra 1931–32

Västsvenska 1931–32

Sydsvenska 1931–32

Footnotes

References 

Swedish Football Division 3 seasons
3
Sweden